Shaanbeikannemeyeria is an extinct genus of dicynodont known from the Early Triassic of China. It contains a single species, S. xilougoensis, which was described in 1980 by Zheng-Wu Cheng from a skull catalogued as IGCAGS V315. The specimen was lost, and a neotype skull IVPP V 11674 was later designated. A second species, S. buergondia, was named by Jin-Lin Li in 1980 from a partial skeleton, but it has since been regarded as a synonym of S. xilougoensis.

Paleobiology
Shaanbeikannemeyeria hails from the Ermaying Formation, which also yields the genera Fenhosuchus, Eumetabolodon, Halazhaisuchus, Guchengosuchus, Neoprocolophon, Ordosiodon, Wangisuchus and Shansisuchus.

See also

 List of therapsids

References

External links
 The main groups of non-mammalian synapsids at Mikko's Phylogeny Archive

Dicynodonts
Prehistoric synapsids of Asia
Fossil taxa described in 1980
Anomodont genera